Municipalidad de Rawson is an Argentinian UCI Continental cycling team founded in 2015, that has been competing at UCI Continental level since 2017.

Team roster

References

External links

UCI Continental Teams (America)
Cycling teams established in 2015
Cycling teams based in Argentina